Asemonea tenuipes is a species of Salticidae (jumping spiders) which can be found on Andaman Islands and in such countries as Burma, India, Sri Lanka, and Thailand. It is commonly referred to as tailed jumper.

References

External links

Salticidae
Spiders of Asia
Spiders described in 1869